Clavatula asamusiensis is a species of sea snail, a marine gastropod mollusk in the family Clavatulidae.

The Australian Faunal Directory considers this species a synonym of Paradrillia inconstans (E.A. Smith, 1875)

Description
The shell grows to a length of 15 mm.

Distribution
This species occurs in the Pacific Ocean off Japan and Queensland, Australia.

References

External links
 

asamusiensis
Gastropods described in 1940